The fifth and final season of the American television series Señora Acero also known as Señora Acero: La Coyote, follows the life of Vicenta Acero, 6 years after the death of her husband Daniel Philips and her new future as a mother. The season was ordered in February 2018, with filming beginning that August. It was later announced that the fifth season would be the final season. Principal cast members Carolina Miranda, Ana Lucía Domínguez, and Diego Cadavid return from previous seasons. The season premiered on 15 October 2018, and concluded on 29 January 2019.

Plot 
Pregnant during eight months, the time comes when Vicenta Acero (Carolina Miranda) decides to bury her husband Daniel Philips (Luis Ernesto Franco), who died after six months have been in a coma. During the funeral of her husband, Vicenta communicates anonymously with Alberto Fuentes (David Chocarro) FBI agent to inform him that the murderer of her husband is at the funeral, after following the track of the call, arrives at the funeral in where is Vicenta and he realizes that it was a false alarm and begins to argue with Vicenta. During the discussion, Vicenta begins to give indications of giving birth and there is only time for her to give birth. Alberto of the nothing receives the son of Vicenta and between them a very strong bond is born that unites them immediately.

On the other hand, El Teca (William Miller), who supposedly died at the hands of Salvador Acero (Michel Duval) 5 years ago. El Teca returns after spending 6 years in prison in the United States just to get revenge on the Acero Family, who ended up with his entire family and his cartel. His only goal is to kill Vicenta's son. Vicenta and Salvador both dedicated to the breeding of horses and Josefina and El Gallo dedicated to politics, have been completely isolated from all the problems for 6 years and away from any danger, but suddenly they will be forced to flee when they find out about the repair of El Teca. Who will use unimaginable methods to destroy them all. Meanwhile, La Tuti (Ana Lucía Domínguez) has managed to keep her son out of Mexico thanks to the profits she has obtained in her business of exotic dancers, but she will be forced to be always protected by guaruras, to avoid that El Teca extorts her and wants to take away her son Álvaro.

Despite all her efforts to keep her family together and safe, Vicenta will make a difficult decision; run away from her family and her new love together with her child. Away from her family, Vicenta together with her son will face many dangers, but not everything is bad for her, on the way away from her family and the whole world she meets Lucas Iglesias (Guillermo Zulueta), a hippie who gives her an inn on the beach where he works. In this new refuge, she meets La Mecha (María Rojo), who suddenly becomes a new mother for Vicenta; and Nancy (Patricia Manterola) who becomes her best friend. In this new world in which everyone just wants to defend their children, Vicenta and La Tuti join forces to end El Teca, and thus be able to give their children a better future and to sleep in peace.

Cast 

 Carolina Miranda as Vicenta Acero, she is a coyote that is dedicated to crossing migrants on the border, half-sister of Salvador Acero, widow of Daniel Phillips and girlfriend of Alberto Fuentes.
 David Chocarro as Alberto Fuentes, he is an FBI agent, boyfriend of Vicenta
 Ana Lucía Domínguez as La Tuti
 Paulina Gaitán as Leticia Moreno, Corrupted FBI agent and John Floyd's right hand.
 William Miller as Acasio Martínez, the former leader of Tijuana cartel. He be able to take revenge on Acero-Quintanilla clan for murder of his sons Julián and Álvaro. He is amputated on his right arm.
 Mauricio Islas as Héctor Ruiz, he is the corrupted president of Mexico.
 Omar Fierro as Christian Almeida, the director of FBI.
 Michel Duval as Salvador Acero, he is the half-brother of Vicenta, and Rosario's boyfriend. Together with his sister they cross migrants on the border of Mexico. He is killed by El Teca Martínez.
 Emiliano Zurita as Felipe Quintanilla Aguilar
 Aurora Gil as Josefina Aguilar, she is the First Lady of Municipal President of Matamoros, Felipe's mother and El Gallo's wife.
 Óscar Priego as El Gallo, he is the Municipal President of Matamoros. Joesfina's husband, Felipe's father.
 Camila Selser as Sofía Gómez "La Mandrágora“, El Teca's security women.
 Lambda García as Miguel Sandoval, FBI agent, killed by El Bruto, by the orders of El Teca.
 Jonathan Islas as Tecolote, he is a cold-blooded murderer who starts working for El Indio Amaro on the recommendation of Indira. He is killed by Vicenta.
 Patricia Manterola as Nancy Salas
 Mónica Dionne as Rebeca Londoño
 Miguel Pizarro as Venustiano, Rogelio and Bernardo's father, Regina's wife.
 Jessica Segura as Aída Franco, sister of Rosario.
 Fabián Corres as El Tablas
 Samantha Siqueiros as Rosario Franco, she is Salvador's girlfriend, and Aida's sister.
 Guillermo Zuleta as Lucas Iglesias
 Arantza Ruiz as Samantha Peña
 Eduardo Amer as Bebote, is one of the security men of Los Acero. He is killed by Sofia by the orders of El Teca Martínez.
 Tatiana Martínez as Lucía
 Felipe Betancourt as Azuceno, Julian's former security men, now became Aceros’ security men.
 Andrea Portugal as Virginia
Costanza Andrade as Ana Vega
 Alan Alarcón as El Bronco
 Ruy Senderos as Bernardo
 Juan Aguirre as El Bruto
 Luisa Sáenz as Reyna Peña
 Diana Santos as Iris
 Mauro Sánchez Navarro as Petronilo Godínez Pérez 
 Alexander Holtmann as John Floyd, he is the corrupted director of FBI.
 Silvia Carusillo as Regina
 Ari Placera as Danielito
 Dagoberto Gama as Juan Román
 María Rojo as Mercedes Berríos
 Isadora Vives as Elizabeth Acero
 Braulio Aranda as Cuauhtémoc Trujillo
 Manuel Castillo as Álvaro Acasio, son of La Tuti and Alvaro, grandson of El Teca Martínez.

Episodes

References 

Señora Acero
2018 Mexican television seasons
2018 American television seasons
2019 American television seasons